A Google Developers Expert (GDE) is a person recognized by Google as having exemplary expertise in web technologies or Google Developers products. GDEs are awarded by membership in the Google Developers Experts program, established and administered by Google. GDEs have a tenure of one year which can be extended upon continuous active contribution to the developer and open source community of that product. A Google Developers Expert cannot be a Google employee whilst a member of the program. GDEs are not permitted to "make any statements on behalf of Google or any Google company" and be clear that any opinions are not those of Google.

As of September 2020, there are 832 people with this designation.

Supported products

 Android
 Angular
 Dart
 Flutter
 Firebase
 HTML5
 Design Sprint
 Google AdWords
 Google Analytics
 Google Apps APIs
 Google Apps Script
 Google Chrome
 Google Cloud Platform
 Google Drive SDK
 Google Glass (US only)
 Google Maps API
 Google Pay
 Google+ Platform
 Machine Learning
 Product Design
 YouTube APIs

History
The Google Developer Experts program initially started in Japan as the Google Developer API Expert program.  In July 2012 Google renamed it to Google Developers Expert program and made it available to developers around the world. In 2014 the official Google Developers Expert site started referring to the program as Google Developer Experts.

See also
 Microsoft Most Valuable Professional

References

External links
 

Developer Expert